Broomball is a winter sport played internationally.  Some of the most notable teams are listed here, along with their achievements in the sport.

Canada 

National Association: Broomball Canada (formerly the Canadian Broomball Federation).
National Team: The Legion

United States 

National Associations: All Elite Broomball (AEB) and the United States Broomball Association (USBA). (formerly USA Broomball)

Italy 

National Association: Comitato Italiano Broomball

Austria 

National Association:

Australia 

National Association: Broomball Australia

Switzerland 

National Association: Association Suisse de Broomball

Japan 

National Association: Japanese Broomball Association

See also

References

Broomball
Broomball teams, List of